The Abelin reaction is a qualitative reaction for demonstrating the presence of arsphenamine and neoarsphenamine in blood and urine.

It is named for Isaak Abelin, Swiss physiologist.

References

Blood tests